Servius was a late fourth-century and early fifth-century grammarian. He earned a contemporary reputation as the most learned man of his generation in Italy; he authored a set of commentaries on the works of Virgil. These works, In tria Virgilii Opera Expositio, constituted the first incunable to be printed at Florence, by Bernardo Cennini, in 1471.

In the Saturnalia of Macrobius, Servius appears as one of the interlocutors; allusions in that work and a letter from Symmachus to Servius indicate that he was not a convert to Christianity.

Commentary on Virgil
The commentary on Virgil survives in two distinct manuscript traditions. 

The first is a comparatively short commentary, attributed to Servius in the superscription in the manuscripts and by other internal evidence. The second class derive from the 10th and 11th centuries, embed the same text in a much expanded commentary. The copious additions are in contrasting style to the original; none of these manuscripts bears Servius' name, and the commentary is known traditionally as Servius auctus or Servius Danielis, from Pierre Daniel who first published it in 1600. 

"The added matter is undoubtedly ancient, dating from a time but little removed from that of Servius, and is founded to a large extent on historical and antiquarian literature which is now lost. The writer is anonymous and probably a Christian", although one proposed author, Aelius Donatus, was a Christian. 

A third class of manuscripts, written for the most part in Italy, includes the core text with interpolated scholia, which demonstrate the continued usefulness of the Virgilii Opera Expositio.

Other works
Besides the Virgilian commentary, other works of Servius are extant: a collection of notes on the grammar (Ars grammatica) of Aelius Donatus; a treatise on metrical endings in verse (De finalibus); and a tract on the different poetic meters (De centum metris).

The edition of Georg Thilo and Hermann Hagen (1878–1902), remains the only edition of the whole of Servius' work. Currently in development is the Harvard Servius (Servianorum in Vergilii Carmina Commentariorum: Editionis Harvardianae); of the projected five volumes, two have so far appeared: ii (Aeneid 1–2), 1946, and iii (Aeneid 3–5), 1965.

References

Sources 

 E. K. Rand, "Is Donatus's Commentary on Virgil Lost?" Classical Quarterly 10 (1916), 158–164. Donatus's authorship of the supplementary material.
 "The Manuscripts of the Commentary of Servius Danielis on Virgil", Harvard Studies in Classical Philology 43 (1932), 77–121;
 "The Manuscripts of Servius's Commentary on Virgil", Harvard Studies in Classical Philology 45 (1934), 157–204.
 Casali, Sergio and Fabio Stok (edd.). Servio: stratificazioni esegetiche e modelli culturali / Servius: exegetical stratifications and cultural models (Bruxelles: Éditions Latomus, 2008) (Collection Latomus, 317).

External links

 Commentary on the Aeneid of Vergil at the Perseus Project in Latin.
 Commentary on the Eclogues of Vergil at the Perseus Project in Latin.
 De Centum Metris at Intratext.com 
 De Centum Metris at Forum Romanorum 
 Servii grammatici qui feruntur in Vergilii carmina commentarii, Georius Thilo, Hermannus Hagen (ed.), 3 vol., Lipsiae in aedibus B. G. Teubneri, 1881–1902: vol. 1, vol. 2, vol. 3 part 1, vol. 3 part 2.

Grammarians of Latin
Virgil
Aeneid
4th-century Latin writers
Late-Roman-era pagans
5th-century Latin writers